Pistarini is an Italian surname. Notable people with this surname include:

 Juan Pistarini (1882–1956), Argentinian general and politician
 Pascual Pistarini (1915–1999), Argentinian equestrian and general
 Roberto Pistarini (born 1948), Argentinian equestrian

See also
 Ministro Pistarini International Airport